Tachymenoides is a genus of snake in the family Colubridae  that contains the sole species Tachymenoides affinis.  Boulenger's slender snake . It is found in Peru.

References 

Dipsadinae
Monotypic snake genera
Reptiles of Peru
Reptiles described in 1896